Hu Bin (born 1973) was a Chinese swimmer specialising in the freestyle sprint events. He is best known for winning the silver medal at the inaugural 1993 FINA World Swimming Championships (25 m) in Palma de Mallorca, Spain, behind Great Britain's Mark Foster.

References
 

1973 births
Living people
Chinese male freestyle swimmers
Medalists at the FINA World Swimming Championships (25 m)
Swimmers at the 1994 Asian Games
Asian Games competitors for China
20th-century Chinese people